El Ferial is a shopping center located in the Madrid town of Parla, in Spain, opened in 1995. It has an area of 30,000 m2 built among them more than 60 commercial premises, and 1700 free parking spaces.

References 

Buildings and structures in the Community of Madrid
Parla
Shopping malls established in 1995
1995 establishments in Spain
Shopping malls in Spain